The 2021 FIM Cross-Country Rallies World Championship was the 18th and final season of the FIM Cross-Country Rallies World Championship, an international rally raid competition for motorbikes and quads. Due to COVID-19 pandemic all events in the previous season were cancelled.

Calendar
The calendar for the 2021 season is set to feature six long-distance rally raid events; including two marathon events in the Silk Way Rally and the Rally dos Sertões.

Regulations and Categories
New categories were initially intended to have been introduced in 2020, but due to that season's cancellation, they will come into effect in 2021 instead. The RallyGP category being for professionals and experienced riders, Rally2 for newcomers, and the Rally Adventure trophy for riders without assistance. SSVs would be introduced as their own category for all events.

The end of season there would be awards as follows:
World Championship for RallyGP riders and manufacturers in the bike class
World Cups for Rally2 riders in the Moto-Rally, Moto-Enduro, and Quad groups.
World Cups for women and juniors in the RallyGP category
World Cups for SSVs

Russian athletes and teams competed as a neutral competitors using the designation MFR (Motorcycle Federation of Russia), as the Court of Arbitration for Sport upheld a ban on Russia competing at World Championships. The ban was implemented by the World Anti-Doping Agency in response to state-sponsored doping program of Russian athletes.

Entry list

Results

Motorbikes

Quads

Championship standings

 Points for final positions were awarded as follows:

An FIM Rally (4 to 6 timed stages) will have a scoring coefficient of 1.
An FIM Marathon Rally (more than 6 timed stages) will have a scoring coefficient of 1,5. The result will be multiplied by 1.5 and then rounded up.

Points for manufacturers were awarded by added the top two finishers of the respective manufacturer together from each event.

RallyGP World Championship: Riders and Manufacturers 
In RallyGP, the final classification will be established on the basis of a rider's best four results, including at least one marathon rally.

RallyGP Women's World Cup

RallyGP Junior World Cup

RallyGP Veteran's Trophy

Rally 2: Moto-Rally World Cup

Quads World Cup

SSV World Cup

References 

FIM Cross-Country Rallies World Championship
Cross-Country Rallies World Championship
Cross-country